The ice dancing competition of the 2012 Winter Youth Olympics was held at the Olympiahalle in Innsbruck on January 15 (short dance) and January 17 (free dance), 2012.

Results

Short dance results

Free dance results

Overall results

External links 
Results

Figure skating at the 2012 Winter Youth Olympics